Adrenaline Rush 2007 is the sixth studio album by rapper Twista. It was released on September 18, 2007. The "2007" in the title references the ten years passed since his third studio album Adrenaline Rush. The first official single from the album was "Give It Up", featuring Pharrell and "Creep Fast (Feat. T-Pain)" was the second single. The professional review from XXL states that the content of commercial and raw talent is a good mix. The album has received generally favorable reviews.

The album debuted at #10 on the U.S. Billboard 200 music chart, selling over 41,000 copies in its 1st week; this was markedly poorer than the first week performance of The Day After, which debuted #2 with about 130,000 copies sold. The album also dropped off the charts quickly, falling to #48 in its second week with over 20,000 copies sold, then falling off the Top 100.

As of June 2008, the album had sold well over 365,000 copies.

Track listing

Other Tracks 
 "Blessed" (featuring Jessi Malay) (Produced by ???)
 "Well It's Time" (Produced by Kanye West)
 "Talk Hard" (featuring Kanjia, Pitbull, & E-40) (Produced by Core DJ's)
 "Two Times for My Nigga" (Produced by ???)
 "Ass Whoop" (featuring Saigon) (Produced by Just Blaze)

Singles 
 "Give It Up"
 "Creep Fast"
 "Pimp Like Me"

External links 
 'Album/Producer Credits At The Vault, Dubcc.com'

References 

2007 albums
Atlantic Records albums
Twista albums
Albums produced by Jazze Pha
Albums produced by the Neptunes
Albums produced by R. Kelly
Sequel albums